The Belarus national badminton team represents Belarus in international badminton team competitions. The Belarusian team is managed by the Belarusian Badminton Federation (BBF) which organizes badminton championships and prepares Belarusian national badminton teams. The team was formed in 1992 after the association was found.

Belarusian-born player, Nadieżda Kostiuczyk won Belarus a gold medal at the European Junior Badminton Championships along with compatriot Olga Roj. Belarus made its badminton debut in the 1996 Summer Olympics. Mikhail Korchouk and Vlada Tcherniavskaia were the first few players to represent Belarus in Olympic badminton.

After the 2022 Russian invasion of Ukraine, the Badminton World Federation (BWF) banned all Belarusian players and officials from BWF events, and cancelled all BWF tournaments in Belarus.

Participation in BWF competitions

Sudirman Cup

Participation in European Team Badminton Championships

Men's Team

Women's Team

Mixed Team

Participation in Helvetia Cup

Current squad 

Men
Amin Pourhadi
Mikalai Piatrushka
Yury Krasnopolsky
Vitaly Primak
Ilya Larushyn

Women
Anastasiya Cherniavskaya
Alesia Zaitsava
Julia Bitsoukova
Maryana Viarbitskaya

References

Badminton
National badminton teams
Badminton in Belarus